Sharkmouth is a studio album by Australian singer–songwriter Russell Morris. It was released on 12 October 2012 by Fanfare, Ambition Records. The album was presented to all the major labels who declined to release it. It peaked at No. 6 on the ARIA Albums Chart to become Morris' first top ten album and the highest selling album of his career.

Sharkmouth is based on stories from Australia's Depression years and some of their colourful characters, like boxer Les Darcy, gangsters of the 1920s and 1930s like Squizzy Taylor and, from the 1940s, Arthur Stace and horse Phar Lap. A Making of Sharkmouth DVD was released on 15 November 2013.

Background

In an August 2013 interview with Michael Smith of TheMusic.com.au, Morris recalled: "I originally did four tracks, 'Blackdog Blues', 'Ballad of Les Darcy', 'Big Red' and 'Sharkmouth' – and I thought I'd see if anyone was interested. We did the rounds and went to all the record companies, and all of them said no." Morris continued with the recording, "I went back offering not only the album but also the publishing on the album and my old publishing, on songs like 'Wings of an Eagle' and 'Sweet, Sweet Love', but they still declined to release it." Morris pressed 500 copies of the album and began performing it at gigs when Robert Rigby from Ambition Entertainment said he'd release it under the FanFare label.

The project was created after Morris had read about a 1920s gangster from Sydney, Shark Jaws. This was the driving force behind a desire to create an album including Australian characters from the 1920s and 1930s era. Mitch Cairns explains: "To our knowledge, most 'Australiana' characters have been portrayed in a traditional colonial folk sense, so we wanted to find a way to deliver the stories in a more mainstream vein whilst still placing them in a 'vintage era'. A blues style seemed to be the perfect fit!! We tried to keep the vibe of the album raw and honest with lots of textural instruments and sounds, but above all, it had to be simple and spacious. We are also very honoured to have some very special guests on the album, including Troy Cassar-Daley, Mark Lizotte and Renée Geyer." The album Sharkmouth has stories about Australian characters which are all moulded together in a melting pot of swinging shuffles and delta grooves.

Accolades

At the ARIA Music Awards of 2013, the album was nominated for and won ARIA Award for Best Blues and Roots Album.

Track listing

Personnel
 Acoustic Guitar, Electric Guitar, Resonator Guitar [Dobro] – Shannon Bourne
 Artwork By – Adam Miller
 Backing Vocals – Jerson Trinidad (tracks: 10), Steve Romig (tracks: 2, 4, 9, 10, 12)
 Banjo, Cello – Mark Lizotte (tracks: 8)
 Bass – Mitch Cairns
 Drums – Adrian Violi
 Electric Guitar [Solo] – Troy Cassar-Daley (tracks: 10)
 Harmonica – Chris Wilson (tracks: 7, 10, 12)
 Mastered By – John Ruberto
 Mixed By – David Carr
 Piano, Organ – James Black (tracks: 2, 9)
 Producer – Mitch Cairns
 Recorded By, Engineer – Mitch Cairns
 Vocals – Renée Geyer (tracks: 7), Russell Morris

Charts

Weekly charts

Year-end charts

Certifications

Release history

References

2012 albums
ARIA Award-winning albums
Russell Morris albums